Dangerous Driving is a racing video game developed by Three Fields Entertainment, released on 9 April 2019 for Microsoft Windows, PlayStation 4, and Xbox One.

Gameplay 
Dangerous Driving is a racing game and considered by the developers as a spiritual sequel to the Burnout series. Players, after selecting a car and track, attempt to beat the other races (computer-controlled, or other online players). Dangerous Driving includes the same crash elements from Burnout; players can ram opponents into the sides of the track or oncoming damage to cause them to crash (known as Takedowns), temporarily stopping them from racing before their car respawns and they can continue on. By performing Takedowns or other driving stunts like drifting, they build up a Nitro meter; once past a certain threshold they can activate Nitro which gives them a speed boost while some part of the meter is filled.

Development 
Three Fields Entertainment was formed by Alex Ward, Fiona Sperry, and Paul Ross, former members of Criterion Games, the original developers of the Burnout  franchise, which was published by Electronic Arts (EA). Around 2011, EA assigned the Need for Speed series to Criterion, de-emphasizing the Burnout series, and then later in 2013 moved about 80% of Criterion's staff to Ghost Games to continue Need for Speed. This move left Ward and Sperry concerned about Criterion's state within EA, and decided to leave, along with Ross, to start Three Fields.

One of Three Fields' founding goals was to recreate a Burnout game on their own terms. As they were a small team (up to seven by the time of Dangerous Driving compared with the 90 they had when Burnout 3: Takedown was shipping), lacking any assets they had from Criterion, they had to take a slower approach towards this goal, and instead planned on developing less ambitious games that were all aimed towards providing the internal support they needed to get to a Burnout game. These games included Dangerous Golf, which help to establish the destruction system essential to Burnout, Danger Zone, which added in driving elements in a closed environment, and its sequel Danger Zone 2, which added larger environments for driving on. These intermediate games were done on limited budgets and within a short time scale, so lacked some elements that they knew they needed to address by the time Dangerous Driving was to be released. While these games were not blockbuster sellers, the revenues from each helped to fund the development of the next game. The small size and limited resources also helped to enhance their efficiency in producing assets. Ward noted that back when they developed Burnout 2, it had taken 40 staff over two months to put together a single level, while with Dangerous Driving, their small team was able to complete a whole build within that time.

Due to its development budget, Dangerous Driving does not include any in-game music, but instead integrates with Spotify to allow players to create their own playlists for the game.

Dangerous Driving was released on 9 April 2019. The game shipped without online multiplayer, but this was added on 24 May.

Reception

Accolades 
The game won the award for "Game, Original Racing" at the NAVGTR Awards.

Sequel 
Three Fields announced Dangerous Driving 2 for a then-planned release of late 2021 for Microsoft Windows, PlayStation 4, Xbox One, and the Nintendo Switch. It is expected to be an open world format, similar in nature to Burnout Paradise.

References 

2019 video games
PlayStation 4 games
Video games about police officers
Video games developed in the United Kingdom
Multiplayer and single-player video games
Racing video games
Windows games
Xbox One games
Three Fields Entertainment games